Two Mile Prairie may refer to

Two Mile Prairie, Missouri
Two Mile Prairie (Florida) a park and preserve